Naif Saleh Abdulaziz Alrajhi, an Entrepreneur, Investor, philanthropist and Saudi businessman, He is Founder and CEO of Naif Alrajhi Investment.

In 2001, Naif Alrajhi launched his career in commerce, while in 2003 he began working in real estate development, He developed several projects and residential towers like "The Time Palace", the first towers in Dubai Marina. In 2011 he launched the first real estate fund in Saudi Arabia and in 2015 a closed fund was introduced with Riyad Capital named Riyadh Real Estate Income Fund which was listed as the first REIT fund in the Saudi Stock Exchange.

In 2019, He was awarded the "Most Innovative Diversified Investment Portfolio" at the International Finance Awards 2019, he was listed in Top 50 Most Influential 2021 by Arabian Business, and Forbes "Top 100 Arab Family Businesses in the Middle East".

Career
He was born in Riyadh, Saudi Arabia. In 2001, Naif Alrajhi launched his career in commerce, while in 2003 he began working in real estate development. He developed several projects and residential towers like "the Time Palace" that are the first towers in Dubai Marina.

In 2007, he founded Memar Investment & Real Estate Development Company, which developed and implemented many residential and hospitality projects. Later in 2011, he launched the first real estate fund of its kind in Saudi Arabia, named The Investor Real Estate Fund for Multiple Projects with The Investor For Securities company. The open fund was issued to the public. In 2015, a closed fund was introduced with Riyad Capital, named Riyadh Real Estate Income Fund, in 2017 when it was listed as the first REIT fund in the Saudi Stock Exchange.

He currently heads Naif Alrajhi Investment Company, which he founded in 2012, headquartered in Riyadh and with offices in London and Dubai. The company boasts diverse and risk-managed investments, including more than 350 investments in 35 companies across 12 sectors: real estate, hospitality, food and beverage, mining, architecture, interior design, contracting, IT, manufacturing, and marketing. The company also invests in capital and property markets.

Since 2012 Naif Alrajhi Investment has been establishing strategic long-term partnerships with many famous companies like: Awfa Investment – Ramla Real Estate Development – Memar Investment & Real Estate Development – Metaform Developments, London – TRS, Dubai – Bohoor International Investment Co. and Phi Group for Advertising and Communication.

Awards and achievements 
In 2019, He was awarded the "Most Innovative Diversified Investment Portfolio" at the International Finance Awards 2019, he was listed in Top 50 Most Influential in Saudi Arabia 2021 by Arabian Business, and he was featured in Forbes's list "Top 100 Arab Family Businesses in the Middle East".

Philanthropy 
In 2014, Alraji made a sponsorship agreement with "Tasamy for Impact", an initiative that was established by Princess Ameera al-Taweel the Vice Chairperson of Alwaleed bin Talal Foundation for enabling sustainable and innovative solutions to societal problems.

He launched a blood donation campaign 2018–2019 with Central Blood Bank and King Faisal Specialist Hospital.  In 2019 his company launched an initiative to provide equipment needs for blind people and to provide aid for people in need.

Personal life
The Alrajhi family are considered one of the wealthiest non-royal families in Saudi Arabia, His father was Saleh Abdulaziz Alrajhi, co-founder of Al-Rajhi Bank and many prominent industrial companies in Saudi Arabia, and his uncle is Sulaiman Abdul Aziz Al Rajhi, a Saudi Arabian corporate figure and billionaire who co-founder of Al-Rajhi Bank.

References

External links 

21st-century Saudi Arabian businesspeople
Living people
Saudi Arabian philanthropists
Year of birth missing (living people)